Paralistroscelis is a genus of bush-cricket containing a single species, Paralistroscelis listrosceloides , that occurs in Madagascar.

References

Carl, 1908. Revue Suisse de Zool. 16:146

Monotypic insect genera
Tettigoniidae genera
Monotypic Orthoptera genera